Sir Albert Edward Woodward  (6 August 1928 – 15 April 2010) was an Australian jurist.

Life and career
Woodward was born in Ballarat in to Eric Woodward (later as Lieutenant General Sir Eric Woodward, a Governor of New South Wales) and Amy Freame (Weller), Lady Woodward. After completing both his primary and secondary education at Melbourne Grammar School, Woodward continued his studies at the University of Melbourne, where he graduated with a Master of Laws. He was admitted to the bar in 1951 and was appointed a Queen's Counsel in 1965. During his career, he sat on several boards and 17 Royal Commissions, on four of which he was the Chairman. 

The most famous of these was the Aboriginal Land Rights Commission in 1973–74. He was President of the Trade Practices Tribunal, 1974–76 and a Justice of the Federal Court of Australia, 1977–90.
As Director-General of Security between 1976 and 1981, he headed the Australian Security Intelligence Organisation.

He was a member of Camberwell Grammar School Council between 1972 and 1987 and Chairman in 1987. He was made a Life Governor of the school in 2002.

In 1990 he succeeded Sir Roy Douglas Wright as Chancellor of his alma mater, the University of Melbourne, a post he held until 2001.

He died in 2010, on 15 April 2010, aged 81.

Honours
He was made an Officer of the Order of the British Empire in 1969, for service as Royal Commissioner into the Stevedoring Industry. He was made a Knight Bachelor in 1982 and Companion of the Order of Australia in 2001.

He declined the governorship of Victoria on the grounds that he did not think it was appropriate for an atheist to hold the position.

Publications

References

External links
 Obituary: Judge sought social justice for all The Sydney Morning Herald, 29 April 2010.
 Three Wigs and Five Hats by A. E. Woodward

1928 births
2010 deaths
Judges of the Federal Court of Australia
Australian royal commissioners
Directors-General of Security
Chancellors of the University of Melbourne
Australian King's Counsel
Companions of the Order of Australia
Australian Knights Bachelor
Australian Officers of the Order of the British Empire
People from Ballarat
Melbourne Law School alumni
Australian atheists
Judges of the Commonwealth Industrial Court